Bossiaea rosmarinifolia, commonly known as Grampians bossiaea, is a species of flowering plant in the family Fabaceae and is endemic to the Grampians in Victoria. It is an erect or spreading shrub with linear leaves and yellow and red flowers.

Description

Taxonomy
Bossiaea rosmarinifolia was first formally described in 1838 by John Lindley in Thomas Mitchell's journal, Three Expeditions into the interior of Eastern Australia. The specific epithet (rosmarinifolia) means "Rosmarinus-leaved".

Distribution and habitat
Grampians bossiaea grows in open forest in the Grampians National Park.

References

rosmarinifolia
Mirbelioids
Flora of Victoria (Australia)
Taxa named by John Lindley
Plants described in 1838